Wojciech Gryniewicz (born 1946) is a Polish sculptor.

Biography
He graduated from State High School fine arts in Bydgoszcz and then studied at the Sculpture Department of the National Academy of Fine Arts in Gdańsk. Gryniewicz was a student of Alfred Wiśniewski and Adam Smolana.

Monuments
 Monument to Julian Tuwim ("Ławeczka Tuwima") in Łódź (bronze), (1999)
 Monument to Jan Nowak-Jeziorański in Warsaw (bronze), (2006)
 School bench in Warsaw (bronze), 2006
 Monument to the victims of Communism in Łódź (bronze), 2009
 Monument to Jan Twardowski in Warsaw (bronze), (2013)

Television
2012: TVP- "Łódź kreatywna – WOJCIECH GRYNIEWICZ"

Prizes
 1975: Monument "Obrońcom Helu"– I Prize Ministry of Culture and National Heritage (Poland)
 1985: "Ochrona zabytków Krakowa"– I Prize
 2003: Monument to Julian Tuwim ("Ławeczka Tuwima")- The Best Art Sculptures 2003 – I Prize
 2005: Monument to Julian Tuwim ("Ławeczka Tuwima")- Prize Poland's Travel, Ministry of Culture and National Heritage (Poland)

Gallery

References
Notes

1946 births
Artists from Bydgoszcz
Polish sculptors
Polish male sculptors
Modern sculptors
Living people
Academy of Fine Arts in Gdańsk alumni